Alex Damásdi (born 27 March 1997) is a Hungarian football player who plays for Gárdony.

Career

Debrecen
On 2 February, Damásdi played his first match for Debrecen in a 0-0 drawn against Újpest in the Hungarian League.

Club statistics

Updated to games played as of 30 October 2019.

References

External links

1997 births
Footballers from Budapest
Living people
Hungarian footballers
Association football midfielders
Puskás Akadémia FC II players
Puskás Akadémia FC players
Csákvári TK players
Ceglédi VSE footballers
Debreceni VSC players
BFC Siófok players
Nemzeti Bajnokság I players
Nemzeti Bajnokság II players
Nemzeti Bajnokság III players
21st-century Hungarian people